The 2000 class railcars are a class of self-propelled railcars built by Commonwealth Engineering, Rocklea for the Queensland Railways between 1956 and 1971.

History

In 1956, two 2000 class railmotor prototypes were constructed by Queensland Railways at its Ipswich Railway Workshops sheeted in satin finished aluminium. They were powered by  AEC engines.

In 1959, ten units were ordered from Commonwealth Engineering. These differed from the prototypes in having sheeted stainless steel and  Rolls-Royce engines. In 1963, a further five were ordered, followed in 1971 by a further ten. The last four were completed as Passenger Luggage Driving Trailers with access doors at both ends instead of a streamlined front, allowing the formation of three-car (and occasionally four-car) trains.

They operated services around Brisbane as well as being allocated to Mackay, Townsville and Cairns.

Most were withdrawn in the early 1990s, with the last operating in regular service on the Corinda-Yeerongpilly line in January 2000.

Queensland Rail retains nine units, of which three operate The Savannahlander tourist train, three are operational with the QR Heritage Division (and occasionally used by Queensland Rail for track inspections) and three are stored at Ipswich Workshops. Aurizon inherited two units from QR National which are used for track inspections. These units are now with DownsSteam Tourist Railway & Museum. Many others are preserved.

Summary

References

External links
Queensland's Great Trains gallery

Railcars of Queensland